Commercial management is "the identification and development of business opportunities and the profitable management of projects and contracts, from inception to completion".

Commercial management within an organization is applied only at policy levels. Commercial policies relate to the rules or practices that define how business will be conducted and the standard terms under which external relationships will be conducted. Many of these policies are reflected in the terms of any contract in which the organization engages. At a transactional level, commercial management is applied through the oversight of trading relationships to ensure their compliance with business goals or policies and to understand or manage the financial and risk implications of any variations.

See also
 Contract management
Government procurement#Government Commercial Function and Government Commercial Organisation within the UK government

References

Management by type